Cristina Gravina (born 8 February 1960 in Bolzano) is a retired Italian alpine skier who competed in the 1980 Winter Olympics.

References

External links
 

1960 births
Living people
Italian female alpine skiers
Olympic alpine skiers of Italy
Alpine skiers at the 1980 Winter Olympics
Sportspeople from Bolzano